Kumbulani Banda (born 21 February 1989) is a footballer, who plays for Bantu Tshintsha Guluva Rovers F.C.

Career
Banda began playing football with Bantu Tshintsha Guluva Rovers F.C., and went on six-month loan to Dynamos in early 2010. The left back left in summer 2010 Dynamos F.C. and returned to Zimbabwe Premier Soccer League rival Bantu Tshintsha Guluva Rovers F.C.

References

External links
Team > Dynamos F.C.

1989 births
Living people
Zimbabwean footballers
Dynamos F.C. players
Association football midfielders